Triathlon is one of the sports at the quadrennial Commonwealth Games competition. It was first granted  Commonwealth Games sport status in 2002, and has been held in each edition since, except in Delhi 2010 Games due to the lack of suitable venue for the swimming leg in Delhi. Until 2022, it was a core sport which had to be included in each competition's sporting programme. Para-triathlon was first included as an optional sport in the Gold Coast 2018 games. The next appearance of the sport will take place in the 2026 Commonwealth Games in Victoria, Australia

Currently there are five triathlon events in the Commonwealth Games.

Individual events are held for men and women and have been since the sport's introduction in 2002, while a mixed team relay has been on the programme since 2014.

Additionally, as part of its program of integrating parasport into the Commonwealth Games, two paratriathlon events were included in the 2018 Games in Gold Coast, Australia. These events, one for each sex, where wheelchair paratriathlon events ('PTW1' and 'PTW2' classifications) using a multiple start format to ensure fairness across different wheelchair classes. A third set of paratriathlon events, as yet undesignated, has been announced for Victoria 2026.

At the 1990 Commonwealth Games at Auckland, Triathlon was a demonstration event; won by Erin Baker (women) and Rick Wells (men), both from New Zealand.

Flora Duffy of Bermuda is the only triathlete of either sex to win two individual gold medals, or to win gold medals in separate Games, while Alistair Brownlee. Jodie Stimpson and Alex Yee have each won two Commonwealth Games gold medals, one individual, one mixed relay, in a single Games. Alistair Brownlee, with two golds and one silver medal, is overall the most successful triathlete in Commonwealth Games history. Jacob Birtwhistle, Matthew Hauser, Jonny Brownlee and Vicky Holland have also won 3 medals, including at least one relay gold.

Editions

Medalists

Men

Women

Mixed team

Paratriathlon men

Paratriathlon women

All-time medal table

References

External links
Commonwealth Games sport index

 
Sports at the Commonwealth Games
Commonwealth Games